|}

The Sprint Stakes is a Group 3 flat horse race in Great Britain open to horses aged three years or older. It is run at Sandown Park over a distance of 5 furlongs and 10 yards (1,015 metres), and it is scheduled to take place each year in early July.

The event is held on the same afternoon as Sandown Park's most prestigious flat race, the Eclipse Stakes.

The race was run for the first time in 1986 as the Trafalgar House Sprint Stakes, at Listed level, and it was promoted to Group 3 status in 2004.

The long-term sponsors of the Eclipse Stakes, Coral, started to sponsor the Sprint Stakes in 2009. It is now known as the Coral Charge.

Records
Most successful horse since 1986:
 no horse has won this race more than once since 1986

Leading jockey since 1986 (3 wins):
 Frankie Dettori – Lochsong (1993), Ancien Regime (2008), A'Ali (2020)

Leading trainer since 1986 (2 wins):
 Ian Balding – Silver Fling (1988), Lochsong (1993)
 Luca Cumani – Night at Sea (1990), Ialysos (2009)
 Richard Hannon Sr. – Bunty Boo (1995), Watching (2000)
 David Nicholls – Ya Malak (1997), Fire Dome (1998)

Winners

See also
 Horse racing in Great Britain
 List of British flat horse races

References
 Racing Post:

 galopp-sieger.de – Sandown Sprint Stakes.
 horseracingintfed.com – International Federation of Horseracing Authorities – Sprint Stakes (2018).
 pedigreequery.com – Sprint Stakes – Sandown Park.

Flat races in Great Britain
Sandown Park Racecourse
Open sprint category horse races